Gavilanes is a Spanish television series, consisting of an adaptation of the Colombian telenovela Pasión de gavilanes. Produced by Gestmusic, its two seasons aired from 2010 to 2011 on Antena 3.

Premise 
Lidia—the younger of the orphan Reyes siblings—falls in love with Bernardo Elizondo, a man 30 years her senior. Both die in a car crash. Suspecting of a homicide, the other three Reyes siblings (Juan, Óscar and Frank) get to be hired to work in the Elizondo estate, seeking to find out what really happened to Lidia. Once inside the rich property, both three brothers will fall in love with the Elizondo sisters, Norma, Sara and Lucía.

Cast 
 Rodolfo Sancho as Juan Reyes.
  as Óscar Reyes.
  as Frank Reyes.
 Claudia Bassols as Norma Elizondo.
  as Sara Elizondo Cortés.
  as Lucía Elizondo.
 Carme Elías as Sofía Cortés.
 Fernando Andina as Fernando Ribas.
 Norma Ruiz as Rosario Montes.
  as Víctor Abreu.
  as Eva Suárez.
  as Claudia Aguirre.
  as Adrián Cortés.
 Jordi Martínez as Mario Nestares.
  as Bernardo Elizondo.
 Miriam Giovanelli as Lidia Reyes.
Introduced in season 2
  as Olivia.
 Adrià Collado as Álvaro.
  as Jaime.
  as Ray.
  as Laura.

Production and release 

Filming started in  a masia in the province of Tarragona.
Season 1 premiered on 19 April 2010 on Antena 3. The finale was scheduled for 12 July 2020, but the celebrations because of the Spanish win in the FIFA World Cup Final delayed the broadcasting to 15 July. The broadcasting run of season 2 ended on 22 February 2011, bringing a total of 26 episodes for the series.

Season 1

Season 2

References 

2010 Spanish television series debuts
2011 Spanish television series endings
Spanish television series based on Colombian television series
2010s Spanish drama television series
Antena 3 (Spanish TV channel) network series
Television shows filmed in Spain